The Clear River is a river in the Central Coast region of British Columbia, Canada, flowing east out of the Pacific Ranges of the Coast Mountains into the Kingcome River, of which it is a tributary.  Other tributaries of the Kingcome are the Atlatzi and the Satsalla.

See also
List of British Columbia rivers
Clear River (disambiguation)

References

,

Rivers of the Pacific Ranges
Rivers of the Central Coast of British Columbia